The 2017 6 Hours of Circuit of the Americas was an endurance sports car racing event held at the Circuit of the Americas, Austin, USA, on 15–17 September 2017, and served as the sixth round of the 2017 FIA World Endurance Championship season. Porsche's Timo Bernhard, Brendon Hartley and Earl Bamber won the race driving the No. 2 Porsche 919 Hybrid car, after the #1 was forced to yield to #2 under team orders.

Qualifying

Qualifying result

Race

Race result
Class winners are denoted with a yellow background.

References

External links 

 

6 Hours of Circuit of the Americas
Circuit of the Americas
Lone Star Le Mans
6 Hours of Circuit of the Americas
Motorsport competitions in Texas
Sports in Austin, Texas